The 1924 South Australian Football League season was the 45th season of the top-level Australian rules football competition in South Australia.

The 1924 SAFL grand final crowd of 44,345 was the largest football crowd in South Australia for 15 years and was larger than any Victorian Football League (VFL) crowd during 1924.

Ladder

Finals series

First Semi-Final

Second Semi-Final

Preliminary Final

Grand Final

References

SAFL
South Australian National Football League seasons